Samuel George Harmon (c. 1861 – c. 1929) was a Liberian politician who served as the 17th vice president of Liberia from 1912 to 1920, under President Daniel Edward Howard. He was a member of the True Whig Party which dominated Liberian politics from 1878 to 1980. He was the Secretary of the Treasury from 1928 until his death.

References

Vice presidents of Liberia
Finance Ministers of Liberia
Year of death missing
True Whig Party politicians
Americo-Liberian people
Year of birth uncertain
20th-century Liberian politicians